The 1933 Simmons Cowboys football team represented Simmons University—now known as Hardin–Simmons University—as a member of the Texas Conference during 1933 college football season. Led by Les Cranfill in his fourth season as head coach, the team went 3–6–1 overall with a conference mark of 1–2–1.

Schedule

References

Simmons
Hardin–Simmons Cowboys football seasons
Simmons Cowboys football